Martial Law is an American crime drama starring Sammo Hung. It premiered on CBS on September 26, 1998 and ended on May 13, 2000, with a total of 44 episodes over the course of 2 seasons.

Series overview

Episodes

Season 1 (1998–1999)

Season 2 (1999–2000)

See also
 "Play It Again, Sammo", a crossover with Early Edition
 "The Day of Cleansing", a crossover with Walker, Texas Ranger

External links
 
 

Martial Law